Gymnodiniaceae is a family of dinoflagellates belonging to the order Gymnodiniales.

Genera
As accepted by GBIF;
 Akashiwo G.Hansen & Moestrup (1) 
 Algidasphaeridium Matsuoka & Bujak, 1988 (3)
 Amphidinium (1)
 Apicoporus  (1)
 Barrufeta  (1)
 Bernardinium  (4)
 Cochlodinium  (28)
 Filodinium  (1)
 Gymnodinium  (308)
 Gyrodinium  (55)
 Lebouridinium  (1)
 Lepidodinium  (2)
 Levanderina  (1)
 Nusuttodinium  (5)
 Pelagodinium  (1)
 Plectodinium  (1)
 Pseliodinium  (1)
 Schillingia  (1)
 Sclerodinium  (2)
 Spiniferodinium  (2)
 Togula  (3)
 Torodinium  (2)

The number in brackets is the assumed number of species per genus.

References

Gymnodiniales
Dinoflagellate families